Luca Gelfi (21 June 1966 – 3 January 2009) was an Italian racing cyclist. A professional from 1988 to 1998, he won two stages of the 1990 Giro d'Italia and one of the 1997 Volta a Portugal. He finished second in the 1993 Milan–San Remo.
After retiring in 1998, he owned and operated a bike shop and directed Team Fratelli Giorgi, a prestigious junior cycling team. Gelfi suffered from clinical depression and committed suicide 
in 2009

Major results

1988
1st Overall Cronostaffetta
4th Firenze–Pistoia
5th Overall Vuelta a Andalucía
8th Giro di Romagna
9th Overall Tirreno–Adriatico
1989
3rd Overall Giro del Trentino
5th Firenze–Pistoia
6th Overall Tour of Belgium
1990
Giro d'Italia
1st Stages 6 & 10 (ITT)
6th Giro di Toscana
10th G.P. Camaiore
1993
2nd Milan–San Remo
2nd Overall Giro di Puglia
1994
6th Overall Tour of the Basque Country
1995
3rd GP Industria & Artigianato di Larciano
4th Trofeo Laigueglia
5th Overall Tour Méditerranéen
8th Tre Valli Varesine
10th Overall Tirreno–Adriatico
1996
9th Overall Tirreno–Adriatico
1997
1st Stage 10 Volta a Portugal
8th Overall GP du Midi-Libre
10th Paris–Tours
10th Giro del Piemonte
1998
6th GP Industria & Artigianato di Larciano
10th Giro di Toscana

References

External links 

1966 births
2009 deaths
Italian male cyclists
Italian Giro d'Italia stage winners
Cyclists from the Province of Bergamo
2009 suicides
Suicides in Italy